Jhordy Hiriart is a Mexican actor, casting director, producer and singer, born in Mexico City. He has appeared in several TV shows and films

TV Shows and Films 

Rebelde (Televisa, 2005)
Bajo el mismo cielo (Telemundo)
Santa Diabla (Telemundo)
Buscando Nirvana (Film) 
Eva la Trailera (Telemundo)
Dama Y Obrero (Telemundo)
Los 8 (short film)
The Cold Case murder (short film)
A change Of Heart (Film) 
Voltea Para Que Te Enamores (Univision)
Ruta 35, La Valvula de Escape (Univision)

References

Living people
Mexican male film actors
Mexican male telenovela actors
Mexican male singers
Year of birth missing (living people)